The Lagos State Civil Service consists of employees in Lagos State government agencies other than the military. Most employees under the service are career civil servants in the Lagos state ministries, progressing based on qualifications and seniority.
The civil service is headed by Head of Service, a senior member of the state civil service appointed by the state Governor. The head of service of Lagos state civil service is Hakeem Muri-Okunola.

Organization
The civil service is mainly organized around the state ministries, headed by a commissioner appointed by the Governor of Lagos state. The Governor's appointments are confirmed by the State House of Representatives.
There are 24 government ministries of Lagos State. 
In some cases a commissioner is responsible for more than one ministry, for example Ministry of Establishments, Training and Pensions may be combined as  Lagos State Ministry of Establishments, Training and Pensions and the commissioners are assisted by a Permanent Secretary, who is a senior civil servant. 
The ministries are responsible for various parastatals (government-owned corporations) such as universities (Education) and the State Broadcasting Commission. The Lagos state ministry is coordinated by the Commissioner, assisted by a Permanent Secretary, who head the civil service departments.

In 2021, Microsoft teamed with the Lagos State Ministry of Science and Technology to train civil officials in Information technology (IT).

List of ministries and their commissioners

References

Civil service in Lagos State
Lagos State
Government of Lagos State
Civil services
Public administration